Raymond Curtis Shook (November 18, 1889 – September 16, 1970) was a Major League Baseball player. He played for the Chicago White Sox in 1916.

References

External links

1889 births
1970 deaths
Chicago White Sox players
Baseball players from Ohio
Ashland-Catlettsburg Twins players
Paris Bourbonites players
Charleston Senators players
Racine Belles (1909–1915) players
Marshalltown Ansons players
Rockford Wakes players